WWGP (1050 AM) is a radio station broadcasting a country music format. Licensed to Sanford, North Carolina, United States, its primary market covers Lee County, Chatham County, Moore County, and Harnett County.  The station is currently owned by Sandhills Broadcasting Group and is the AM sister station of WFJA.

History
The station is named for founding partners, Walter W. Gregory of Rocky Mount, NC, and Waldo W. Primm, also of Rocky Mount prior to moving back to Sanford, NC, to launch Sanford's first radio station, over strong opposition of the local newspaper, which failed to stop the addition of a new media outlet in Sanford. The call letters, WWGP, stand for: Winford W.(Williams) Gregory and Waldo W. Primm, the founders. W.W. Gregory died not long after WWGP began broadcasting, a serious personal loss to the Gregory and Primm families. WWGP was thought by some to represent Primm family names, Gerald Primm and Winford Primm, sons of W. W. Primm and Treva C. Primm.

WWGP signed on the air in 1946.  It was co-owned by close friends Waldo W. Primm, manager/engineer, and Walter W. Gregory, Rocky Mount, NC, financier, for whom the call letters stand.  W. W. Gregory died within the first year or two of WWGP's broadcasting launch. Mr. Primm continued to work to put the station on sound footing, selling it after nearly a decade. WWGP-AM was sold to Frank James Abbott, who eventually sold the station to its current owner Richard K. Feindel.  The sale occurred on January 13, 1994 and today WWGP is owned by WWGP Broadcasting, Inc.  In its early years, WWGP had some local icons as announcers: Bill Buchanan, who for many years did mornings.  Bill Cameron did the afternoon shift.  WWGP concentrated heavily on local news.

Mr. Primm often offered free advertising for local merchants not accustomed to using radio marketing. He was ahead of his time, although some merchants did come to see the benefits of continuing as paying advertisers.

For many years Frank James "Bud" Abbott did local news.  He passed the reigns to Joan Merritts, who was a graduate of CCTI, now CCCC's Radio TV Broadcasting curriculum  and she, upon retirement, Margaret Murchison became news director in 1979.  She recently celebrated 30 years in the news broadcasting industry. Also after the noon newscast, Abbott had syndicated columnist "Drew Pearson" air his five-minute editorial and when Pearson died in 1969, his partner in political crime, "Jack Anderson" aired his political commentary until his death in 2005.  WWGP carried "Paul Harvey News and Comment" at 8:30AM,"Paul Harvey: The Midday Report" at 12:30PM and "Paul Harvey's The Rest of the Story in the late afternoon. Harvey died in early 2009. WWGP also airs ABC Sports.
  
The station broadcasts a mix of local and satellite fed broadcasts. The satellite feeds originate from ABC Radio studios in Dallas, Texas and the station carries the "Today's Best Country" format from ABC. On the local end of things, the morning show "The Swap Shop" is live. Callers list items to buy, sell, or trade from 8:00am – 12:00pm Monday through Saturday. The Swap Shop was originally hosted by Blair Cameron, a 1977 graduate of the Radio TV Broadcasting program at CCTI, under Jerry Farmer's instruction. Dr. Anthony Harrington was one of his classmates, and a graduate of the CCTI Radio/TV broadcasting curriculum as well. Cameron had hosted the swap shop at WWGP's cross-town rival station WEYE, starting in 1978, years before taking on morning show duties at WWGP in 1986. The "Swap Shop" started as a 30-minute program, which only lasted one day, before growing into a multi-hour show.  He was the morning show and swap shop host for ten years, before leaving in 1996.  Brian Lee (aka Brian Ek) took the show to a total of 4 hours each day during the week and was the show host for 9 years and wrote a book entitled "My Days on the Swap Shop" published in 2019 on Amazon.com. Steve Gordon performed the show on Saturdays and took over when Brian Lee left in 2011. Gordon left on August 3, 2012. Since Gordon's departure, the show is being temporarily hosted by a guest host until a permanent replacement is named. During "The Swap Shop" Margaret Murchison airs local news updates each hour. WWGP carries news from the "American Information Radio Network" of ABC at the top of each hour. Richard K. Feindel, owner of WWGP died on November 24, 2015, at the age of 70, one day after undergoing heart surgery in Durham, NC. According to the Sanford Herald Newspaper of February 6, 2019 WWGP and WFJA have been sold by Susan Feindel to Sandhills Broadcasting Group with principal owner Jon Hockaday as the buyer.

References

External links
 Official WWGP 1050 AM Website

WGP
Radio stations established in 1946
1946 establishments in North Carolina